Ray "Bubba" Sorensen is an American artist, businessman, and politician serving as a member of the Iowa House of Representatives from the 23rd district. Elected in November 2018, he assumed office on January 14, 2019.

Early life and education 
Sorensen was born in Creston, Iowa and raised in Fontanelle, Iowa. He studied art at Iowa State University.

Career 
Prior to entering politics, Sorensen worked as a graphic designer for Edje Technologies and Livestock Plus. He also co-owns, with his wife, Sorensen Studios, a photography and mural-painting business. After watching Saving Private Ryan as a 19 year old at Iowa State University in 1999, Sorensen was inspired to paint the first Freedom Rock, located along Interstate 80 near Menlo, Iowa.

Sorensen was elected to the Iowa House of Representatives in November 2018 and assumed office on January 14, 2019. He serves as chair of the House Economic Growth Committee. He previously served as vice chair of the House Appropriations Committee.

References 

Living people
People from Creston, Iowa
People from Adair County, Iowa
Republican Party members of the Iowa House of Representatives
Year of birth missing (living people)